The 2018 United States Senate election in Nevada took place November 6, 2018, to elect one of two U.S. senators from Nevada. Democratic nominee Jacky Rosen defeated Republican incumbent Dean Heller.

Heller had considered a bid for Nevada governor but instead announced he would run for reelection to a second full term. He was the only incumbent Republican senator running in a state that Hillary Clinton won in 2016. Rosen's victory marked the first time that Nevada has been represented by two women in the United States Senate, and the first time a Democrat had won the Class 1 Senate seat in Nevada since 1994 (as well as the first time both Senate seats were held by Democrats since 2001). Heller was the only Republican incumbent to lose a Senate seat in 2018.

The candidate filing deadline was March 16, 2018, and the primary election was held on June 12.

Background
Nevada is a swing state that once leaned slightly rightward, having voted for George W. Bush twice. But since 2008 it has seen the opposite trend, giving Barack Obama a seven-point victory in 2012 while simultaneously electing Heller to the Senate by one point. Obama also carried Nevada in 2008 by a 12.5% margin. In 2016, the state shifted rightward again, still voting for Hillary Clinton, but only by two points, although Democrat Catherine Cortez Masto managed to win the seat of retiring Democratic Senate leader Harry Reid. Because of the consistent swing nature of the state, many cited Heller as the most vulnerable incumbent Republican in the U.S. Senate up for reelection in 2018, a year with few Republicans in that position; President Donald Trump even warned that if Heller failed to vote to pass the GOP Health care bill to repeal and replace the Affordable Care Act, he could well lose his seat in the next election.

At the end of September 2018, the Brett Kavanaugh Supreme Court nomination became a major element of the campaign. Heller made noncommittal remarks and a significant campaign was deployed to criticize his support for Kavanaugh.

Rosen is only the 37th sitting House freshman to win a Senate election, the first female representative to do so, and the first one-term House Democrat to become a senator-elect since James Abourezk in 1972.

Republican primary

Candidates

Declared
 Sherry Brooks
Sarah Gazala, teacher
 Vic Harrell
Tom Heck
Dean Heller, incumbent U.S. Senator

Withdrew
 Danny Tarkanian, businessman, former attorney and perennial candidate (ran for NV-03 and lost)

Declined
 Mark Amodei, U.S. Representative (ran for re-election and won)

Endorsements

Polling

with Danny Tarkanian

Results

Democratic primary

Candidates

Declared
 Danny Burleigh
 David Drew Knight
 Sujeet "Bobby" Mahendra, businessman and candidate for the U.S. Senate in 2016
 Allen Rheinhart, civil rights activist (Black Lives Matter), candidate for U.S. Senate in 2016
Jacky Rosen, U.S. Representative
 Jesse Sbaih, attorney and candidate for NV-03 in 2016

Declined
 Stephen Cloobeck, businessman (endorsed Heller)
 Aaron Ford, Majority Leader of the Nevada Senate (ran for Attorney General and won)
 Steven Horsford, former U.S. Representative (ran for NV-04 and won)
 Ruben Kihuen, U.S. Representative (endorsed Rosen)
 Kate Marshall, former State Treasurer, nominee for Secretary of State in 2014 and nominee for NV-02 in 2011 (ran for Lieutenant Governor and won)
 Rory Reid, former chairman of the Clark County Commission, nominee for governor in 2010 and son of former U.S. Senator Harry Reid
 Dina Titus, U.S. Representative and nominee for governor in 2006 (ran for re-election and won)
 Steve Wolfson, Clark County District Attorney (ran for re-election and won)

Endorsements

Results

Independents

Candidates

Declared
 Barry Michaels, businessman, convicted felon and perennial candidate
 Kamau Bakari

General election

Debates
Complete video of debate, October 19, 2018

Predictions

Endorsements

Fundraising

Polling

{| class="wikitable" style="font-size:90%;"
|- valign=bottom
! Poll source
! Date(s)administered
! Samplesize
! Marginof error
! style="width:60px;"| DeanHeller (R)
! style="width:60px;"| JackyRosen (D)
! style="width:60px;"| TimHagan (L)
! None ofthese
! Other
! Undecided
|-
| HarrisX
| align=center| November 3–5, 2018
| align=center| 600
| align=center| ± 4.0%
| align=center| 45%
|  align=center| 47%
| align=center| –
| align=center| –
| align=center| –
| align=center| –
|-
| HarrisX
| align=center| November 2–4, 2018
| align=center| 600
| align=center| ± 4.0%
| align=center| 46%
| align=center| 46%
| align=center| –
| align=center| –
| align=center| –
| align=center| –
|-
| Emerson College
| align=center| November 1–4, 2018
| align=center| 1,197
| align=center| ± 3.0%
| align=center| 45%
|  align=center| 49%
| align=center| –
| align=center| –
| align=center| 3%
| align=center| 4%
|-
| HarrisX
| align=center| November 1–3, 2018
| align=center| 600
| align=center| ± 4.0%
|  align=center| 46%
| align=center| 45%
| align=center| –
| align=center| –
| align=center| –
| align=center| –
|-
| HarrisX
| align=center| October 31 – November 2, 2018
| align=center| 600
| align=center| ± 4.0%
|  align=center| 45%
| align=center| 44%
| align=center| –
| align=center| –
| align=center| –
| align=center| –
|-
| HarrisX
| align=center| October 30 – November 1, 2018
| align=center| 600
| align=center| ± 4.0%
|  align=center| 46%
| align=center| 43%
| align=center| –
| align=center| –
| align=center| –
| align=center| –
|-
| Trafalgar Group (R)
| align=center| October 29 – November 1, 2018
| align=center| 2,587
| align=center| ± 1.9%
|  align=center| 49%
| align=center| 46%
| align=center| –
| align=center| –
| align=center| 2%
| align=center| 3%
|-
| HarrisX
| align=center| October 29–31, 2018
| align=center| 600
| align=center| ± 4.0%
| align=center| 45%
| align=center| 45%
| align=center| –
| align=center| –
| align=center| –
| align=center| –
|-
| HarrisX
| align=center| October 24–30, 2018
| align=center| 1,400
| align=center| ± 2.6%
| align=center| 43%
|  align=center| 46%
| align=center| –
| align=center| –
| align=center| –
| align=center| –
|-
| rowspan=2| CNN/SSRS
| rowspan=2 align=center| October 24–29, 2018
| align=center| 622 LV
| align=center| ± 4.8%
| align=center| 45%
|  align=center| 48%
| align=center| 2%
| align=center| 4%
| align=center| 0%
| align=center| 1%
|-
| align=center| 807 RV
| align=center| ± 4.2%
| align=center| 41%
|  align=center| 44%
| align=center| 4%
| align=center| 8%
| align=center| 0%
| align=center| 3%
|-
| Gravis Marketing
| align=center| October 24–26, 2018
| align=center| 773
| align=center| ± 3.5%
| align=center| 45%
|  align=center| 47%
| align=center| –
| align=center| –
| align=center| –
| align=center| 7%
|-
| Ipsos
| align=center| October 12–19, 2018
| align=center| 1,137
| align=center| ± 3.0%
|  align=center| 47%
| align=center| 41%
| align=center| –
| align=center| –
| align=center| 8%
| align=center| 4%
|-
| Public Policy Polling (D-Protect Our Care)
| align=center| October 15–16, 2018
| align=center| 648
| align=center| ± 3.9%
| align=center| 46%
|  align=center| 48%
| align=center| –
| align=center| –
| align=center| –
| align=center| 7%
|-
| Vox Populi Polling
| align=center| October 13–15, 2018
| align=center| 614
| align=center| ± 3.7%
| align=center| 49%
|  align=center| 51%
| align=center| –
| align=center| –
| align=center| –
| align=center| –
|-
| Emerson College
| align=center| October 10–12, 2018
| align=center| 625
| align=center| ± 4.2%
|  align=center| 48%
| align=center| 41%
| align=center| –
| align=center| –
| align=center| 3%
| align=center| 8%
|-
| NYT Upshot/Siena College
| align=center| October 8–10, 2018
| align=center| 642
| align=center| ± 4.0%
|  align=center| 47%
| align=center| 45%
| align=center| –
| align=center| –
| align=center| 1%
| align=center| 7%
|-
| rowspan=4| NBC News/Marist
| rowspan=4 align=center| September 30 – October 3, 2018
| rowspan=2 align=center| 574 LV
| rowspan=2 align=center| ± 5.5%
|  align=center| 44%
| align=center| 42%
| align=center| 8%
| align=center| 2%
| align=center| <1%
| align=center| 4%
|-
|  align=center| 46%
| align=center| 44%
| align=center| –
| align=center| 5%
| align=center| 1%
| align=center| 4%
|-
| rowspan=2 align=center| 780 RV
| rowspan=2 align=center| ± 4.5%
|  align=center| 42%
| align=center| 41%
| align=center| 8%
| align=center| 3%
| align=center| <1%
| align=center| 6%
|-
|  align=center| 45%
| align=center| 43%
| align=center| –
| align=center| 6%
| align=center| 1%
| align=center| 6%
|-
| Kaiser Family Foundation/SSRS
| align=center| September 19 – October 2, 2018
| align=center| 513
| align=center| ± 5.0%
|  align=center| 45%
| align=center| 44%
| align=center| –
| align=center| –
| align=center| 4%
| align=center| 7%
|-
| rowspan=2| CNN/SSRS
| rowspan=2 align=center| September 25–29, 2018
| align=center| 693 LV
| align=center| ± 4.6%
| align=center| 43%
|  align=center| 47%
| align=center| 4%
| align=center| 5%
| align=center| 0%
| align=center| 1%
|-
| align=center| 851 RV
| align=center| ± 4.1%
| align=center| 40%
|  align=center| 43%
| align=center| 5%
| align=center| 10%
| align=center| 0%
| align=center| 2%
|-
| Ipsos
| align=center| September 7–17, 2018
| align=center| 1,039
| align=center| ± 4.0%
|  align=center| 46%
| align=center| 43%
| align=center| –
| align=center| –
| align=center| 4%
| align=center| 8%
|-
| Gravis Marketing
| align=center| September 11–12, 2018
| align=center| 700
| align=center| ± 3.7%
| align=center| 45%
|  align=center| 47%
| align=center| –
| align=center| –
| align=center| –
| align=center| 8%
|-
| Suffolk University
| align=center| September 5–10, 2018
| align=center| 500
| align=center| ± 4.4%
| align=center| 41%
|  align=center| 42%
| align=center| 2%
| align=center| 2%
| align=center| 4%
| align=center| 9%
|-
| Public Policy Polling (D-Protect Our Care)
| align=center| August 20–21, 2018
| align=center| 528
| align=center| ± 4.3%
| align=center| 43%
|  align=center| 48%
| align=center| –
| align=center| –
| align=center| –
| align=center| –
|-
| Suffolk University
| align=center| July 24–29, 2018
| align=center| 500
| align=center| ± 4.4%
|  align=center| 41%
| align=center| 40%
| align=center| 2%
| align=center| 5%
| align=center| 3%
| align=center| 9%
|-
| SurveyMonkey/Axios
| align=center| June 11 – July 2, 2018
| align=center| 1,097
| align=center| ± 5.5%
| align=center| 45%
|  align=center| 48%
| align=center| –
| align=center| –
| align=center| –
| align=center| 7%
|-
| Gravis Marketing
| align=center| June 23–26, 2018
| align=center| 630
| align=center| ± 3.9%
| align=center| 41%
|  align=center| 45%
| align=center| –
| align=center| –
| align=center| –
| align=center| 14%
|-
| Public Policy Polling (D-Health Care Voter)
| align=center| April 30 – May 1, 2018
| align=center| 637
| align=center| ± 3.9%
| align=center| 42%
|  align=center| 44%
| align=center| –
| align=center| –
| align=center| –
| align=center| 14%
|-
| SurveyMonkey/Axios
| align=center| April 2–23, 2018
| align=center| 1,332
| align=center| ± 5.0%
| align=center| 44%
|  align=center| 50%
| align=center| –
| align=center| –
| align=center| –
| align=center| 6%
|-
| The Mellman Group
| align=center| April 12–19, 2018
| align=center| 600
| align=center| ± 4.0%
|  align=center| 40%
| align=center| 39%
| align=center| –
| align=center| –
| align=center| –
| align=center| 21%
|-
| Public Policy Polling (D-Protect Our Care)
| align=center| March 15–17, 2018
| align=center| 720
| align=center| ± 3.7%
| align=center| 39%
|  align=center| 44%
| align=center| –
| align=center| –
| align=center| –
| align=center| 17%
|-
| Public Policy Polling
| align=center| June 23–25, 2017
| align=center| 648
| align=center| ± 3.9%
| align=center| 41%
|  align=center| 42%
| align=center| –
| align=center| –
| align=center| –
| align=center| 17%

{| class="wikitable"
|- valign=bottom
! Poll source
! Date(s)administered
! Samplesize
! Marginof error
! style="width:100px;"| GenericRepublican
! style="width:100px;"| GenericDemocrat
! Undecided
|-
| Public Policy Polling (D-Protect Our Care)
| align=center| March 15–17, 2018
| align=center| 720
| align=center| ± 3.7%
| align=center| 41%
|  align=center| 47%
| align=center| 12%

with Dina Titus

Results

Heller carried 15 of Nevada's 17 county-level jurisdictions, but Rosen carried the two largest, Clark (home to Las Vegas) and Washoe (home to Reno). She won Clark County by over 92,000 votes, almost double her statewide margin of over 48,900 votes.

Counties that flipped from Republican to Democratic
 Washoe (largest municipality: Reno)

Notes

References

External links
Candidates at Vote Smart
Candidates at Ballotpedia
Campaign finance at FEC
Campaign finance at OpenSecrets

Official campaign websites
Tim Hagan (L) for Senate
Dean Heller (R) for Senate
Barry Michaels (I) for Senate
Jacky Rosen (D) for Senate

2018
Nevada
United States Senate